Stefano Mordini (born 10 August 1968) is an Italian film director and screenwriter.

He is married to actress Valentina Cervi with whom he has two children.

Filmography
 Smalltown, Italy (2005)
 Steel (2012)
 Pericle (2016)
 The Invisible Witness (2018)
 The Players (2020)
 You Came Back (2020)
 The Catholic School (2021)
 2 Win (TBA)

References

External links
 

1968 births
Living people
Italian film directors
Italian screenwriters
Italian male screenwriters